Faheem Rashad Najm (born September 30, 1984), known by his stage name T-Pain, is an American rapper, singer, songwriter, and record producer. T-Pain popularized the creative use of the Auto-Tune pitch correction effect, used with extreme parameter settings to create distinctive vocal sounds. Others followed, including rappers Snoop Dogg, Lil Wayne, Kanye West, Future and Travis Scott. 

After signing with singer Akon's Konvict Muzik, T-Pain founded a vanity label imprint, Nappy Boy Entertainment, in 2005. His debut album, Rappa Ternt Sanga, was released in 2005. In 2007, T-Pain released his second album, Epiphany, which reached number one on the US Billboard 200 chart. His third album, Three Ringz, was released in 2008. The albums included a string of hit singles, including "I'm Sprung", "I'm 'n Luv (Wit a Stripper)", "Buy U a Drank (Shawty Snappin')", "Bartender", "Can't Believe It", and "5 O'Clock". T-Pain has received 12 Grammy Awards nominations and two awards: one with Kanye West for "Good Life" and the other with Jamie Foxx for "Blame It". From 2006 to 2010, T-Pain was featured on more than 50 chart-topping singles. His most successful feature to date was on Flo Rida's debut single "Low", which has been certified diamond (10× platinum) by the Recording Industry Association of America (RIAA).

Early life 
Najm was born and raised in Tallahassee, Florida, to parents Aliyah, a Bahamian chef, and Shasheem, who founded the Homeboyz to Men program. His stage name is short for "Tallahassee Pain", and was chosen because of the hardships he experienced while living there. Najm was brought up in a Muslim household, but he has expressed his lack of interest in the concept of religion. At three years old, he got his first taste of the music business when a friend of the family, gospel jazz artist/producer Ben Tankard, allowed him to spend time and "twist the knobs" at his recording studio. At age ten, Najm turned his bedroom into a music studio, using a keyboard, a beat machine and a four-track recorder.

Career

1999–2006: Early career and Rappa Ternt Sanga 
T-Pain joined the rap group Nappy Headz in 1999 and later recorded "I'm Fucked Up", a cover version of Akon's single "Locked Up". Akon eventually came across the song and immediately offered him a deal to his label, Konvict Muzik. While T-Pain was offered other record deals, with the highest bidding being US$900,000, Akon promised the young artist a personal mentorship in the industry. After being discovered, T-Pain began singing instead of rapping, and subsequently recorded and released his debut album, Rappa Ternt Sanga, on December 6, 2005. The album reached number thirty-three on the Billboard 200, and has since been certified Gold by the RIAA, for reaching sales of 500,000 units.

The album was preceded by the lead single, "I'm Sprung", which was released in August 2005 and reached number eight on the Billboard Hot 100 and number nine on the Hot R&B/Hip-Hop Songs chart. The second single, "I'm N Luv (Wit a Stripper)", featuring Mike Jones, was released in December 2005 and reached number five on the Hot 100 and number ten on the Hot R&B/Hip-Hop Songs chart. The third and final single from the album, "Studio Luv", was released in October 2006 but failed to chart.

2007–2008: Epiphany 

In mid-2006, T-Pain began work on his second album, now with the Zomba Label Group as well as Konvict Muzik and Jive Records. The album, titled Epiphany, was released on June 5, 2007. The album sold 171,000 records in its first week, reaching number one on the Billboard 200. The record has since sold 819,000 records in the United States.

The album was preceded by the lead single "Buy U a Drank (Shawty Snappin')" featuring Yung Joc in February 2007. The single reached number one on both the Hot 100 and Hot R&B/Hip-Hop Songs chart, becoming his first single to top charts. The album's second single, "Bartender", featuring Akon was released in June 2007 and reached number five on the Hot 100 and number nine on the Hot R&B/Hip-Hop Songs chart. The third and final single from the album, "Church", was released in October 2007 but failed to chart in the United States.

Speaking in May 2007 to noted UK R&B writer Pete Lewis, of the award-winning Blues & Soul about his reason for naming his second album 'Epiphany', T-Pain stated: "One of the two dictionary meanings of epiphany is 'a sudden moment of insight or revelation'. And to me the title 'Epiphany' signifies the moment I realized that, to make the best music I can, I needed to just go in the studio and be myself, and not concentrate so hard on following other people's formulas."

While promoting his second album, T-Pain made guest appearances on multiple songs by other artists. T-Pain was featured on "I'm a Flirt" (remix) by R. Kelly with T.I., "Outta My System" by Bow Wow, "Baby Don't Go" by Fabolous, "I'm So Hood" by DJ Khaled with many other rappers, "Shawty" by Plies, "Kiss Kiss" by Chris Brown, "Low" by Flo Rida, and "Good Life" by Kanye West. In two weeks in late 2007, T-Pain was featured on four top ten singles on the Billboard Hot 100 chart

"Good Life" with Kanye West later won the BET Award for Best Collaboration and was nominated in several other categories. In 2008, the single won a Grammy Award for Best Rap Song.

2007–2009: Three Ringz 
In 2007, T-Pain began work on his third album with Rocco Valdes, Akon and Lil Wayne. The album was also his first under his Nappy Boy Entertainment. T-Pain's third studio album, Three Ringz, was released on November 11, 2008. The album sold 168,000 records in its first week, reaching number four on the Billboard 200. A mixtape, Pr33 Ringz, was released in early 2008 before the album.

The album was preceded by three singles. Its lead single, "Can't Believe It", featuring Lil Wayne, was released in July 2008. The single reached number seven on the Hot 100 and number two on the Hot R&B/Hip-Hop Songs chart. The album's second single, "Chopped 'N' Skrewed", featuring Ludacris, was released in September 2008. The single reached number twenty-seven on the Hot 100 and number three on the Hot R&B/Hip-Hop Songs chart. The third and final single from the album, "Freeze", featuring Chris Brown, was released in October 2008 and reached number thirty-eight on the Hot 100 and number thirty-nine on the Hot R&B/Hip-Hop Songs chart. Guest appearances on Three Ringz included T.I., Lil Wayne, Ludacris, DJ Khaled, Ciara, Chris Brown and Kanye West among others. Pr33 Ringz was the introduction mixtape for the album.

In 2008, T-Pain continued to appear on numerous rap singles, such as "She Got It" by 2 Pistols, "Go Girl" by Ciara, "The Boss" by Rick Ross, "Cash Flow" by Ace Hood, "Shawty Get Loose" by Lil Mama, "One More Drink" by Ludacris, and "Go Hard" by DJ Khaled with Kanye West. T-Pain and Ludacris collaborated to perform "Chopped 'N' Skrewed" and "One More Drink" on American late-night television programs Jimmy Kimmel Live! on ABC in November 2008 and on NBC's Saturday Night Live in the same month. T-Pain appeared again on SNL in February 2009 (S34E15, hosted by Bradley Cooper with musical guest TV on the Radio) as a feature in the Digital Short premier of The Lonely Island single, "I'm on a Boat," off their Incredibad album. T-Pain also supported the album in 2009 with his Thr33 Ringz Tour, which included sold-out shows across North America. T-Pain and rapper Lil Wayne formed the duo T-Wayne in 2008. The duo released a self-titled mixtape in late 2008; it charted on the Billboard 200 in January 2009. Their debut album was going to be released in 2009, but never was.

2009–2012: RevolveR 
He collaborated with country pop singer Taylor Swift for the CMT Music Awards, performing "Thug Story", a parody of Swift's hit single "Love Story". In an interview with MTV, T-Pain announced that he would release his fourth studio album in November 2009 and that its title would be UBER. He stated that although he originally wanted to release the album in the summer of 2010, his label had pushed the release forward. However, the album was not released in 2009.

An iPhone application called "I Am T-Pain", featuring an auto tuner, allowing fans to record and modify their own voice to accompany an instrumental collection of T-Pain's music, was released in September 2009. In July 2009, T-Pain endorsed the 2009 T-Pain Killa Cam-Pain, a grassroots effort to help him become elected as president of Florida State University.

In November 2009, T-Pain released the first single from his fourth studio album, "Take Your Shirt Off". The single only managed to reach number eighty on the Hot 100, and was later dubbed a promotional single. In February 2010, he released "Reverse Cowgirl" featuring Young Jeezy, which was the official lead single from his fourth studio album. He later release an updated version of the song excluding Young Jeezy's verse and adding a new bridge. The single reached number seventy-five on the Hot 100 and number sixty-four on the Hot R&B/Hip-Hop Songs chart, becoming a mild hit. The single has since been dubbed a promotional single. T-Pain was later featured on the "We Are the World 25 for Haiti" single in February 2010, which reached number two on the Hot 100. In March 2010, T-Pain developed and starred in Cartoon Network's Adult Swim animated musical special, Freaknik: The Musical.

T-Pain released a mixtape on his Nappy Boy label in February 2010, T-Pain Presents: Nappy Boy All Stars Vol.1, which contained remixes of songs including "Forever" by Drake. On May 5, 2011, he announced another mixtape, prEVOLVEr, serving as a predecessor to his album. The mixtape including collaborations from artists such as Lil Wayne and Field Mob. In June 2010, T-Pain confirmed that his fourth studio album, now titled RevolveR, had been completed and mastered, but that it would not be released until album sales increase. T-Pain's first feature film, Lottery Ticket, was released on August 20, 2010. In October 2010, T-Pain release his third promotional single, "Rap Song". The song charted poorly, peaking at 89 on the Hot 100.

T-Pain was featured on the hit single "All I Do Is Win" by DJ Khaled, along with the remix. He featured on Wisin & Yandel's single "Imaginate" and Bun B's single "Trillionaire." In the last two quarters of 2010, he was featured on the hit singles "Hey Baby (Drop It To The Floor)" by Pitbull, and "Move That Body" by Nelly. He was also featured on another single by Wisin & Yandel along with rapper 50 Cent called "No Dejemos Que Se Apague." The last two singles T-Pain was featured on in 2010 were the official remixes to "Black & Yellow" by rapper Wiz Khalifa and "Loving You No More".

T-Pain was featured on the first single by DJ Khaled called "Welcome To My Hood" off his 2011 album We the Best Forever. The song featured him along with Rick Ross, Plies, and Lil Wayne. He was also featured on albums such as Drake's Take Care, Lil Wayne's Tha Carter IV and Tech N9ne's All 6s and 7s. A new toy called "iAm T-Pain Microphone" was released in 2011, at the price of $39.99. On January 29, 2011, T-Pain was featured on Italian DJ Benny Benassi's song "Electroman", released as the third single in the album of the same name. In January, JRandall released a single, "Can't Sleep", featuring T-Pain. On March 22, 2011, the next single from RevolveЯ, "Best Love Song", was released, featuring Chris Brown. On Twitter, T-Pain stated that he would release his prEVOLVEЯ mixtape when he got 500,000 followers and release his album RevolveЯ when he got 1,000,000 followers. Also in 2011, he appeared on another Adult Swim show: the sixth-season premiere episode of Squidbillies, performing a version of the theme song in addition to the original song "(I Like) Drivin' In My Truck" with Unknown Hinson; this song was released in 2012 as part of the free digital album The Squidbillies Present: Music For Americans Only Made by Americans in China for Americans Only God Bless America, U.S.A. on the Adult Swim Music website.

On October 7, RCA Music Group announced it was disbanding Jive Records along with Arista Records and J Records. With the shutdown, T-Pain (and all other artists previously signed to these three labels) would henceforth release all material (including RevolveЯ) on the RCA Records brand. The album RevolveЯ was eventually released in December 2011, alongside the transatlantic Top 10 single "5 O'Clock", which samples UK songstress Lily Allen and features Wiz Khalifa.

2013–2017: Oblivion 
On April 1, 2013, after the announcement of T-Pain cutting off his signature dreads, he announced the title of his fifth studio album, then entitled Stoicville: The Phoenix stating, "To me, a Phoenix represents new beginnings. A new era, a new life, I'm rising from the ashes." Prior to releasing his fifth studio album, he released T-Pain Presents Happy Hour, a greatest hits compilation. Its first single, "Up Down (Do This All Day)", produced by DJ Mustard and featuring B.o.B, was officially released on August 13, 2013. The song peaked at number 62 on the Billboard Hot 100. The second single "Drankin Patna" was released a year later on July 21, 2014. On November 7, 2014, T-Pain premiered the intro/title track off of Stoicville. On November 21, 2014, T-Pain premiered "Coming Home" as the first promotional single in support of Stoicville and made it available for free on his official website.

On June 8, 2015, T-Pain released a song titled "Make That Shit Work" featuring Juicy J. Following another delay, T-Pain confirmed the album was still on its way, missing its December 11 expected release date to further delay. On December 9, 2015, to mark the one-year anniversary of the most popular Tiny Desk Concert ever and the 10th anniversary of his debut album, Rappa Ternt Sanga, T-Pain performed a short set of some previous hits, along with a cover of "A Change Is Gonna Come" and the premiere of a new song, "Officially Yours".

On October 27, 2016, T-Pain premiered "Dan Bilzerian" featuring Lil Yachty. He worked with Bruno Mars on his third studio album, 24K Magic, as one of the writers on the track "Straight Up & Down".

After teasing the release of a long-shelved collaboration project with Lil Wayne, T-Wayne was released on May 18, 2017, via T-Pain's SoundCloud for streaming and free digital download. It consists of eight tracks recorded in 2009 described as "lost demos". In 2017, he collaborated with Italian rappers J-Ax and Fedez for the single "Senza pagare", from the album Comunisti col Rolex. After numerous delays and project name changes, T-Pain's fifth album Oblivion was released November 17, 2017.

2019: 1UP 
On February 27, 2019, the same day T-Pain was revealed to be the winner of the first US season of The Masked Singer, he released a surprise new album titled 1UP and announced a new U.S. tour in support of it. He hosted the iHeartRadio Music Awards on March 14.

In December 2020, T-Pain appeared in ComplexLand virtual event to discuss his thoughts on the future of esports.

Other ventures

Phone app 
On September 24, 2009, T-Pain joined with iPhone app creator Smule to create a new app entitled "I Am T-Pain" to allow people to use his style of Auto-Tune in karaoke; it was released the following day.

Film and television 
In May 2009, T-Pain made an appearance on a live-action episode of Aqua Teen Hunger Force as Frylock, where he made his debut as an actor. In late 2009, T-Pain developed a concept to create an animated television special, Freaknik: The Musical, which he submitted to Adult Swim. It premiered on March 7, 2010, and features many guest celebrities such as Lil Wayne, Young Ca$h, Snoop Dogg, Sophia Fresh, Rick Ross, Andy Samberg and Charlie Murphy.

T-Pain made his cinema acting debut in the comedy film Lottery Ticket as a liquor store clerk.

In November 2016, T-Pain also appeared in an episode of the YouTube series Epic Rap Battles of History as American singer Stevie Wonder.

T-Pain was the champion of the first season of the Fox reality music competition The Masked Singer as "Monster". He returned as a guest panelist in the sixth episode of season three.

Since 2018, T-Pain has been the host of T-Pain's School of Business, a documentary series airing on Fuse in which T-Pain travels around the United States meeting with different entrepreneurs. The show has aired for two seasons so far: the first in 2018, which had six episodes, and the second in 2019, which had eight episodes.

Musical style 
T-Pain has defined his own style of music as "Hard & B", a play on R&B.

He uses the software GarageBand and Logic Pro to produce his own beats.

Use of Auto-Tune 
Musically, T-Pain is best known for popularizing the use of Auto-Tune, a pitch-correcting audio processor, for vocals, with the effect turned up to give the voice a robotic quality. He has used this effect throughout his singing career, starting in 2003. This use of Auto-Tune had been pioneered by Cher in her 1998 hit "Believe". T-Pain, who had been looking for a way to make his voice sound unique, was inspired to use Auto-Tune after hearing the Darkchild remix of the 1999 song "If You Had My Love" by Jennifer Lopez, which makes occasional use of the effect. He was also inspired in part by a similar sound achieved by Roger Troutman in the 1980s (using a talk box) and Teddy Riley in the 1990s (using both talk boxes and vocoders).

After the success of T-Pain's first two albums, his use of Auto-Tune was copied by a number of hip hop artists, including Snoop Dogg on the 2007 single "Sensual Seduction", Lil Wayne on the 2008 single "Lollipop", Kanye West on the 2008 album 808s & Heartbreak (on which T-Pain served as a consultant), the Black Eyed Peas on the 2009 single "Boom Boom Pow", and Diddy on the 2010 album Last Train to Paris. In a November 2008 interview, T-Pain revealed that Diddy had paid him for the right to use Auto-Tune in T-Pain's style on the then-upcoming Last Train to Paris, and he felt that other artists should do the same.

In 2009, rapper Jay-Z released the single "D.O.A. (Death of Auto-Tune)", which criticized the practice. The song directly mentioned T-Pain, with the lyrics "You niggas singing too much/ Get back to rap, you T-Paining too much." Jay-Z has insisted that the song was not a personal attack on T-Pain, and that he was simply criticizing a trend that he felt had run its course. T-Pain has said that he loved the song. However, he felt personally hurt by a general backlash against the use of Auto-Tune that began at around the same time. Nevertheless, he has continued to use Auto-Tune, feeling that it is simply part of his musical style, as opposed to jumping on a trend as was the case for other artists.

Personal life 
T-Pain has been married to Amber Najm (nee Wyatt) since 2003. They have three children: one daughter, Lyriq, and two sons Muziq and Kaydnz Kodah (born May 2009).

On March 27, 2009, T-Pain was involved in a golf cart accident, the same day he was due for a music video shoot for Lil' Kim's "Download" song. He suffered cuts, bruises, and four missing teeth and had emergency dental work done. He returned to performing two days later.

On April 1, 2013, T-Pain revealed that he had cut off his iconic dreadlocks, stating "We must all learn to adjust with our surroundings. Those who get stuck doing the same things for too long are bound to get left behind the strong who press on & reinvent themselves. Also good news hair grows back."

On August 30, 2016, T-Pain's niece, Javona Glover, was stabbed to death in a local Walgreens store in his hometown, Tallahassee, Florida. In 2017, a suspect in the case was found dead in an apparent suicide.

He is an avid gamer who regularly streams on Twitch. He has many tattoos, some of which are internet memes or otherwise Internet-related.

Legal issues 
On April 28, 2007, T-Pain refused to shorten his performance at Radio One's Spring Fest Concert in Miami, which caused police presence to escalate backstage. He became agitated after concert officials stopped his performance of "Buy U a Drank (Shawty Snappin')". Police chased him and his entourage out of the premises and detained them.

In June 2007, a warrant was issued for T-Pain's arrest for driving with a suspended license. He subsequently turned himself in to the Leon County Jail on November 2, 2007. He was held without bail but was released three hours later.

Discography 

Studio albums
 Rappa Ternt Sanga (2005)
 Epiphany (2007)
 Three Ringz (2008)
 Revolver (2011)
 Oblivion (2017)
 1UP (2019)
 On Top of the Covers (2023)

Filmography

Film

Television

Awards and nominations 
American Music Awards
2007, Favorite Male Artist (Nominated)
BET Awards
2009, Best Male R&B Artist (Nominated)
2009, Best Collaboration ("Blame It") with Jamie Foxx (Won)
2009, Viewer's Choice ("Can't Believe It") with Lil Wayne (Nominated)
2008, Best Collaboration ("Kiss Kiss") with Chris Brown (Nominated)
2008, Best Collaboration ("Low") with Flo Rida (Nominated)
2008, Viewer's Choice ("Kiss Kiss") with Chris Brown (Nominated)
2008, Best Collaboration ("Good Life") with Kanye West (Won)
2008, Video of the Year ("Good Life") with Kanye West (Nominated)
BET Hip Hop Awards
2009. Producer of the Year (Nominated)
2008, Best Ringtone ("Low") with Flo Rida (Nominated)
2008, Best Hip-Hop Video ("Good Life") with Kanye West (Won)
2008, Best Hip-Hop Collabo ("Low") with Flo Rida (Nominated)
2008, Best Hip-Hop Collabo ("Good Life") with Kanye West (Nominated)
2008, Track of the Year ("Good Life") with Kanye West (Nominated)
 BMI Urban Awards
 Song Writer Of The Year (Won)
 Producer Of The Year shared with J.R. Rotem & Kanye West (Won)
Grammy Awards

|-
| rowspan="4"| 2008
| "Bartender" (featuring Akon)
| Best R&B Performance by a Duo or Group with Vocals
| 
|-
| rowspan="2"| "Good Life" (with Kanye West)
| Best Rap Song
| 
|-
| rowspan="4"|Best Rap/Sung Collaboration
| 
|-
| "Kiss Kiss" (with Chris Brown)
| 
|-
| rowspan="4"| 2009
| "Got Money" (with Lil Wayne)
| 
|-
| rowspan="2"| "Low" (with Flo Rida)
| 
|-
| Best Rap Song
| 
|-
| Tha Carter III (as featured artist & producer)
| Album of the Year
| 
|-
| rowspan="4"| 2010
| "I'm on a Boat" (with The Lonely Island)
| Best Rap/Sung Collaboration
| 
|-
| rowspan="2"| "Blame It" (with Jamie Foxx)
| Best R&B Performance by a Duo or Group with Vocals
| 
|-
| Best R&B Song
| 
|-
| Three Ringz
| Best Contemporary R&B Album
| 
|-
|}

Nickelodeon Kids Choice Awards
2009, Favorite Male Singer (Nominated)
Ozone Music Awards
2008, TJ's DJ's Hustler of the Year (Nominated)
2008, Club Banger of the Year ("I'm So Hood") with DJ Khaled, Trick Daddy, Rick Ross, & Plies (Nominated)
2008, Club Banger of the Year ("Low") with Flo Rida (Nominated)
2008, Best Rap/R&B Collaboration ("She Got It") with 2 Pistols & Tay Dizm (Nominated)
2008, Best R&B Artist (Nominated)
2008, Best TJ's DJ's Tastemaker Award (Won)
2007, Best Male R&B Artist (Won)
2007, Best Rap/R&B Collaboration ("Shawty") with Plies (Won)
2007: Best Rap/R&B Collaboration ("Buy U a Drank (Shawty Snappin')") with Yung Joc (Nominated)
2006, Best Rap/R&B Collaboration ("I'm N Luv (Wit a Stripper) (Remix)" with Twista, Pimp C, Paul Wall, R. Kelly, MJG, and Too Short) (Won)
MTV Video Music Award
2008, Best Hip-Hop Video ("Low") with Flo Rida (Nominated)
2008, Best Male Video ("Low") with Flo Rida (Nominated)
2007, Monster Single of the Year ("Buy U a Drank (Shawty Snappin)"), featuring Yung Joc (Nominated)
People's Choice Awards
2008, Favorite Hip-Hop Song, "Low" with Flo Rida [Won]
2008, Favorite Hip-Hop Song, "Good Life" with Kanye West [Nominated]
Teen Choice Awards
2008, Choice Hook-Up: Flo Rida Featuring T-Pain, "Low" (Nominated)
2008, Choice Music: R&B Artist – T-Pain (Nominated)
2008, Choice Music: Rap/Hip-Hop Track – Lil Mama featuring Chris Brown and T-Pain, "Shawty Get Loose" (Won)
Vibe Awards
2007, Best R&B Artist (Nominated)
2007, Best Collaboration ("Buy U a Drank (Shawty Snappin)") with Yung Joc (Nominated)
2007, Song of the Year ("Buy U a Drank (Shawty Snappin)") with Yung Joc (Won)
Brit Asia TV Music Awards
2014, Best Music Video ("Daddy Da Cash" by RDB feat. T-Pain) (Won)
The Streamer Awards
2023, Best Music Streamer (Won)

References

External links 

Official website
Nappy Boy Records

1984 births
Living people
21st-century American rappers
Masked Singer winners
African-American male rappers
African-American record producers
American contemporary R&B singers
American Muslims
American hip hop record producers
American hip hop singers
American music industry executives
American people of Bahamian descent
Businesspeople from Florida
Grammy Award winners for rap music
Jive Records artists
Musicians from Tallahassee, Florida
Pop rappers
Singers from Florida
RCA Records artists
Reality show winners
Rappers from Florida
Songwriters from Florida
Twitch (service) streamers
African-American male singer-songwriters
21st-century African-American male singers